RAAF Station Bulga was an aerodrome constructed in 1942 by the Royal Australian Air Force north of Bulga, New South Wales, Australia during World War II.

The aerodrome consisted of four runways.

The aerodrome was served by the satellite fields of Warkworth, Broke and Strowan.

References

Bulga
Military establishments in the Hunter Region
Former military installations in New South Wales